"Take Me Up" is a song by the Italian Italo disco band Scotch, written by singers Vince Lancini and Fabio Margutti.

Composition 

The song was written by Vince Lancini and Fabio Margutti and produced by Walter Verdi, David Zambelli and Walter Zambelli.

Charts

References 

1984 songs
1985 singles
Scotch (band) songs
ZYX Music singles